Master of European Design (MEDes) is a unique degree programme within a network of seven leading design schools in Europe.

The structure of the programme
During the five-year programme, students experience three design education systems and join a strong international community. The location diversity provides insight into design approaches, multi-national perspectives and creates sensitivity towards cultural differences.

 In the first and second year, the students study at their home universities
 The third year is spent at one of the international partner universities
 At the end of third year, the students submit their BA theses to their home university. 
 The fourth year is spent at a second partner university
 For the fifth - final year - the students return to their home universities to complete their Master theses.

During the two years abroad the students follow the curricular content offered by the programme of the respective partner university. This results in each student acquiring a unique skill set and combination of projects. The studies abroad take place in English or in the respective national language.

The seven European Design partner institutions
Glasgow School of Art, Glasgow, United Kingdom
Aalto School of Art and Design, Helsinki, Finland
Politecnico di Milano, Milan, Italy
ENSCI-Les Ateliers, Paris, France
Konstfack, Stockholm, Sweden
Köln International School of Design, Cologne, Germany
University of Aveiro, Aveiro, Portugal

Previous partners
Staatliche Akademie der Bildenden Künste Stuttgart

References

Sources

 Official Homepage
Description of MEDes on Köln International School of Design Homepage 
Description of MEDes on the ENSCI Homepage
Description of MEDes on the Politecnico di Milano Homepage
An Article about MEDes on core77 Design blog
MEDes on cumulusassociation.org

External links
Official Website of the Master of European Design Programme (MEDes)
Glasgow School of Art, GB-Glasgow
University of Art and Design, FI-Helsinki
Politecnico di Milano, I-Mailand
ENSCI-Les Ateliers, F-Paris
Konstfack, SE-Stockholm
Staatliche Akademie der bildenden Künste, D-Stuttgart
Köln International School of Design, D-Köln

Master's degrees